Yapal (also Romanized as Yāpal and Yāpāl; also known as Vāpal) is a village in Chehel Cheshmeh Rural District, in the Central District of Divandarreh County, Kurdistan Province, Iran. At the 2006 census, its population was 652, in 126 families. The village is populated by Kurds.

References 

Towns and villages in Divandarreh County
Kurdish settlements in Kurdistan Province